A list of films produced by the Israeli film industry in 1982.

1982 releases

Unknown premiere date

See also
1982 in Israel

References

External links
 Israeli films of 1982 at the Internet Movie Database

Israeli
Film
1982